Abdul Rashid Bin Ahad also known as Abdul Rashid Ahad (born 20 March 1990) is a Malaysian cricketer. He was a member of the Malaysian cricket team which claimed gold medal in the men's 50 overs tournament after defeating Singapore by 251 runs in the finals at the 2017 Southeast Asian Games.

In September 2019, he was named in Malaysia's squad for the 2019 Malaysia Cricket World Cup Challenge League A tournament. He made his List A debut for Malaysia, against Vanuatu, in the Cricket World Cup Challenge League A tournament on 25 September 2019.

References

External links 
 
 

1990 births
Living people
Malaysian cricketers
People from Negeri Sembilan
Southeast Asian Games gold medalists for Malaysia
Southeast Asian Games medalists in cricket
Competitors at the 2017 Southeast Asian Games